The 2016 Cittadino Challenger was a professional tennis tournament played on clay courts. It was the fourth edition of the tournament which was part of the 2016 ATP Challenger Tour. It took place in Meerbusch, Germany, between 15 and 21 August 2016.

Entrants

Seeds 

 1 Rankings as of 8 August 2016.

Other entrants 
The following players received wildcards into the singles main draw:
  Aliaksandr Prudnikau
  Nicola Kuhn
  Oscar Otte
  Marvin Greven

The following players received entry from the qualifying draw:
  Nico Matic
  Daniel Cox
  Andrei Vasilevski
  Mikhail Elgin

Champions

Singles 

  Florian Mayer def.   Maximilian Marterer, 7–6(7–4), 6–2

Doubles 

  Mikhail Elgin /  Andrei Vasilevski def.  Sander Gillé /  Joran Vliegen, 7–6(8–6), 6–4

References

2016 ATP Challenger Tour
Maserati Challenger
Cittadino Challenger